Touch the Sun may refer to:

Television
Touch the Sun (Australian TV series), 1988

Music
Touch the Sun, a 1995 album by Show-Ya
"Touch the Sun" (song), a 2022 song by Cryalot